Aqbolagh (also Romanized as Āqbolāgh; also known as Āg Bolāq and Aghbalagh Lar) is a village in Lar Rural District, Laran District, Shahrekord County, Chaharmahal and Bakhtiari Province, Iran. At the 2006 census, its population was 343, in 92 families. The village is populated by Turkic people with a small Persian minority.

One of the best sites for star watching

grape of this region is popular for its special taste

References 

Populated places in Shahr-e Kord County